was a Japanese film director and film industry executive.

Career
Born in Nagano Prefecture, Ikeda first worked at the post office before heading to Tokyo in 1920 to join the theater world. He entered the Shochiku studio in 1921 and debuted as a film director the same year with Nasanu naka. He became one of the top directors of Shochiku's Kamata studio in Tokyo, scoring a major hit with Sendō kouta in 1923. He eventually quit directing films in 1936 and became a film producer. After World War II, he became the secretary general of first the Motion Picture Producers Association of Japan and then Eirin.

His wife was Sumiko Kurishima, one of Japan's first female film stars and the star of Sendō kouta.

Selected filmography
 Nasanu naka (生さぬ仲) (1921)
 Sendō kouta (船頭小唄) (1923)

References

External links 

Japanese film directors
1892 births
1973 deaths
Silent film directors
People from Nagano Prefecture